The Austrian Armed Forces Operations Medal was established in 2001 to recognize operational service by the Military of Austria. The medal is 40 mm wide and round, suspended from a ribbon that varies depending on the type of operation.

Appearance
The medal is round,  in diameter, and made of bronze. On the front of the medal in the center the inscription EINSATZ FÜR ÖSTERREICH surrounded by an open-topped laurel wreath. The back of the medal shows the Coat of arms of Austria surrounded by the inscription ÖSTERREICHISCHES BUNDESHEER. It is suspended from a triangular folded ribbon.

See also
Honours system in Austria

References

Military awards and decorations of Austria